Irish Countrysports and Country Life Magazine is an Irish hunting, shooting, fishing and country lifestyle magazine. From 1985 until 2002 it was known as The Irish Hunting, Shooting and Fishing Magazine. The magazine is produced quarterly and features seasonal articles on hunting, fishing, shooting, deer stalking, gamekeeping, gundogs, art, antiques, property, interior design and conservation.

History
The Irish Hunting, Shooting and Fishing Magazine, the publication's original title, was first published in April 1985 and has a number of editors including founding editor Albert Titterington, Thomas Wilkes and Emma Cowan. It was renamed Irish Countrysports and Country Life by Albert Titterington and Emma Cowan in 2002. It is Ireland’s longest continuously published country sports magazine.
Over the years, the magazine has carried articles by such sportsmen as Capt. Jimmy Hamilton, Major William Brownlow, John Beach, Tony Jackson and Simon Everett.

The magazine has been involved in supporting or sponsoring country sports and fishing bodies in Ireland, including FISSTA, NARGC, CAI, IFA Countryside, and BASC.

References

Magazines published in Ireland
Fishing in Ireland
Magazines established in 1985
Lifestyle magazines
Quarterly magazines
1985 establishments in Ireland